Medics, also known under the original title Lekarze, is a Polish medical drama which aired from 3 September 2012 to 30 November 2014 on TVN.

Episodes

Season 1 (2012)

Season 2 (2013)

References

2012 Polish television seasons